Branch retinal artery occlusion (BRAO) is a rare retinal vascular disorder in which one of the branches of the central retinal artery is obstructed.

Presentation
Abrupt painless loss of vision in the visual field corresponding to territory of the obstructed artery is the typical history of presentation. Patients can typically define the time and extent of visual loss precisely.

Retinal whitening that corresponds to the area of ischemia is the most notable finding. In chronic phase the retinal whitening disappears.

Risk factors
Risk factors include:
 Hypertension
 Elevated lipid levels
 cigarette smoking
 Diabetes
 Susac's syndrome - This is one of the key symptoms of the disease.

Diagnosis
Ancillary testing is not usually necessary to make the diagnosis. Fluorescein angiography reveals an abrupt diminution in dye at the site of the obstruction. Visual field testing can confirm the extent of visual loss.

Treatment
No proved treatment exists for branch retinal artery occlusion.
In the rare patient who has branch retinal artery obstruction accompanied by a systemic disorder, systemic anti-coagulation may prevent further events.

Epidemiology
The mean age of affected patients is 60 years. The right eye is affected more commonly than the left eye which probably reflects the greater possibility of cardiac or aortic emboli traveling to the right carotid artery.
Most of the cases are due to emboli to the retinal circulation. Three main types of retinal emboli have been identified: Cholesterol, calcific, and fibrin-platelet.

See also  
 Central retinal artery occlusion
 Central retinal vein occlusion
 Branch retinal vein occlusion

References

External links 

Diseases of arteries, arterioles and capillaries
Disorders of choroid and retina